Valerie Winter (born 15 October 1936) is an Australian sports shooter. She competed in two events at the 1988 Summer Olympics.

References

External links
 

1936 births
Living people
Australian female sport shooters
Olympic shooters of Australia
Shooters at the 1988 Summer Olympics
Place of birth missing (living people)
20th-century Australian women
21st-century Australian women